Nostalchic is the debut studio album by British record producer Lapalux. It was released via Brainfeeder on 25 March 2013. It peaked at number 27 on the UK Dance Albums Chart.

Critical reception
At Metacritic, which assigns a weighted average score out of 100 to reviews from mainstream critics, Nostalchic received an average score of 79% based on 13 reviews, indicating "generally favorable reviews."

Lauren Martin of Fact said: "Whilst Nostalchic is Lapalux's most full-bodied work to date, it’s also one of the finer examples of how the recent house-meets-r'n'b explosion can be executed with subtlety and finesse." Jonah Bromwich of Pitchfork gave the album a 7.4 out of 10, saying, "keeping solidly in line with the Brainfeeder tradition, Nostalchic is a forward-looking album, warm and comfortable but never obvious."

Inthemix placed it at number 16 on the "Top 20 Albums of 2013" list.

Track listing

Charts

References

External links
 

2013 debut albums
Brainfeeder albums